Plainfeld is a municipality in the district of Salzburg-Umgebung in the state of Salzburg in Austria.

Geography
Plainfeld lies in the Flachgau 12 km east of the city of Salzburg.

The neighboring municipalities are Eugendorf, Hof bei Salzburg, Thalgau, and Koppl.

References

Cities and towns in Salzburg-Umgebung District